Oxybelini is a tribe of square-headed wasps in the family Crabronidae. There are about 15 genera and more than 440 described species in Oxybelini.

Genera
These 15 genera belong to the tribe Oxybelini:

 Belarnoldus Antropov, 2007
 Belokohlus Antropov, 2007
 Belomicrinus Antropov, 2000
 Belomicroides Kohl, 1899
 Belomicrus A. Costa, 1867
 Brimocelus Arnold, 1927
 Enchemicrum Pate, 1929
 Gessus Antropov, 2001
 Guichardus Antropov, 2007
 Minimicroides Antropov, 2000
 Nototis Arnold, 1927
 Oxybelomorpha Brauns, 1897
 Oxybelus Latreille, 1797
 Pseudomicroides Antropov, 2001
 Wojus Antropov, 1999

References

External links

 

Crabronidae
Articles created by Qbugbot